The 1930–31 Scottish Division One season was won by Rangers by two points over nearest rival Celtic. Hibernian and East Fife finished 19th and 20th respectively and were relegated to the 1931–32 Scottish Division Two.

League table

Results

References 

 Statto.com

1930–31 Scottish Football League
Scottish Division One seasons
Scot